The Delaware Senate is the upper house of the Delaware General Assembly, the state legislature of the U.S. state of Delaware.  It is composed of 21 Senators, each of whom is elected to a four-year term, except when reapportionment occurs, at which time Senators may be elected to a two-year term. There is no limit to the number of terms that a Senator may serve. The Delaware Senate meets at the Legislative Hall in Dover.

In order to accommodate the ten-year cycle of reapportionment, the terms of office of the several Senators are staggered so that ten Senators are elected to terms of two years at the first biennial general election following reapportionment, followed by two four-year terms, and eleven Senators are elected at the said election for two four-year terms, followed by a two-year term.

Like other upper houses of state and territorial legislatures and the federal U.S. Senate, the Senate can confirm or reject gubernatorial appointments to the state cabinet, commissions, boards, or justices to the Delaware Supreme Court.

Qualifications
Senators must be citizens of the United States, have lived in Delaware for three years, and have been a resident of their respective district for at least one year preceding their election. They must also be at least 27 years old at the time of their election.

Senate leadership
The Lieutenant Governor of Delaware serves as the President of the Senate, but only casts a vote if required to break a tie. In his or her absence, the President Pro Tempore presides over the Senate. The President Pro Tempore is elected by the majority party caucus followed by confirmation of the entire Senate through a Senate Resolution. The President Pro Tempore is the chief leadership position in the Senate. The other Senate leaders are elected by their respective party caucuses.

Composition

Members
Below are the Senators as of the 152nd General Assembly (2022–2024), following the most recent election.

Past composition of the Senate

See also
List of Delaware state senators (1776–1831)
Delaware House of Representatives

References

External links
Delaware General Assembly - Senators

General Assembly Senate
State upper houses in the United States